William Marvin Walker (January 14, 1929 – May 21, 2006) was an American country music singer and guitarist best known for his 1962 hit, "Charlie's Shoes". Nicknamed The Tall Texan, Walker had more than 30 charting records during a nearly 60-year career, and was a longtime member of the Grand Ole Opry.

Biography

Early years
Billy Walker was born in Ralls, Texas, United States, and was the youngest of three children. His mother died when he was only six years old, and Billy's father was unable to care for him and his two older brothers. Some of the children, including Billy, were placed in a Methodist orphanage in Waco, Texas. He attended High School in Whiteface, Texas, and had won a talent contest which entitled him to appear on radio in Clovis, New Mexico. He had returned to live with his father at the age of 11. Inspired by the music of Gene Autry as a teenager, he had begun his professional music career in 1947 at age 18. After his debut on Clovis radio as a teenager he later joined the Big D Jamboree in Dallas in 1949. The same year, Hank Thompson helped him sign with Capitol Records after he worked with Walker in Waco. His manager at the time had him wear a Lone Ranger-style black mask and billed him as The Traveling Texan, the Masked Singer of Country Songs.

In 1951, Walker signed with Columbia Records and the following year joined the Louisiana Hayride in Shreveport, Louisiana, where he and Slim Whitman were responsible in part for Elvis Presley's first appearance on the radio program. In 1954, Walker scored his first hit with "Thank You for Calling". His early Columbia recordings were at a Dallas studio owned by producer Jim Beck, responsible for hits by Ray Price, Lefty Frizzell and others. In 1955, Walker, Presley and Tillman Franks teamed up for a tour of West Texas. Walker soon became a cast member of ABC-TV's Ozark Jubilee in Springfield, Missouri, where he began a long friendship with host, Red Foley.

Country music career
After a brief attempt at rock and roll, Walker played the Texas bar circuit before moving to Nashville, Tennessee, in 1959 and joining the Grand Ole Opry in 1960. He was one of the first artists to record a Willie Nelson song; and although his 1961 version of "Funny How Time Slips Away" only reached No. 23 on Billboards country singles chart, it helped establish Walker's national reputation. In 1962, he topped the chart with "Charlie's Shoes", the only No. 1 single of his career. His smooth tenor was well-suited to other Western-inspired hits including "Matamoros" and "Cross the Brazos at Waco" (1964).

After performing at a charity concert in Kansas City, Kansas on March 3, 1963, Walker received a call to return to Nashville. Fellow performer Hawkshaw Hawkins gave Walker his commercial airline ticket, and instead flew back to Tennessee on March 5 on a private plane, which crashed, killing Hawkins, Patsy Cline, Cowboy Copas and pilot Randy Hughes.

After leaving Columbia in 1965, Walker signed with producer Fred Foster's Monument Records and moved to MGM in 1970 and to RCA Records in 1974. He later recorded for several independent labels, including his own Tall Texan label.

In the late 1960s, he hosted a syndicated television show, Billy Walker’s Country Carnival, and appeared on other country music TV programs. Walker performed around the world, and several times during the 1980s sang at the International Festival of Country Music at Wembley Arena in London. In April 2006, Walker recorded the duet "All I Ever Need Is You" with Danish singer Susanne Lana for Hillside House Records. The recording, at Signal Path Studio in Nashville, Tennessee, was produced by Charlie McCoy.

Walker continued to tour and remained a mainstay on the Grand Ole Opry, and was scheduled to perform two days following his death with Terri Clark, Porter Wagoner and others.

Death
On May 21, 2006, Walker died in a road accident when the van he was driving back to Nashville after a performance in Foley, Alabama, veered off Interstate 65 in Fort Deposit and overturned. His wife Bettie; bassist Charles Lilly Jr., son of Everett Lilly of The Lilly Brothers; and guitarist Daniel Patton were also killed. The Walkers, Lilly, and Patton died instantly. Walker's grandson, Joshua Brooks, survived with serious injuries. Walker was interred in Spring Hill Cemetery in Nashville.

Discography
Albums
{| class="wikitable"
! Year
! Album
! width="45"| US Country
! Label
|-
| 1961
| Everybody's Hits but Mine
| align="center"| —
| rowspan="5"| Columbia
|-
| 1963
| Greatest Hits
| align="center"| —
|-
| rowspan="2"| 1964
| Anything Your Heart Desires
| align="center"| —
|-
| Thank You for Calling
| align="center"| 18
|-
| 1965
| The Gun, The Gold and the Girl /Cross the Brazos at Waco
| align="center"| 13
|-
| 1966
| A Million and One
| align="center"| 13
| rowspan="7"| Monument
|-
| 1967
| The Walker Way
| align="center"| 37
|-
| rowspan="2"| 1968
| I Taught Her Everything She Knows
| align="center"| 38
|-
| Salutes the Country Music Hall of Fame
| align="center"| —
|-
| rowspan="2"| 1969
| Portrait of Billy
| align="center"| 40
|-
| How Big Is God
| align="center"| —
|-
| rowspan="2"| 1970
| Darling Days
| align="center"| —
|-
| When a Man Loves a Woman(The Way That I Love You)
| align="center"| 40
| rowspan="7"| MGM
|-
| rowspan="2"| 1971
| I'm Gonna Keep On Lovin' You /She Goes Walkin' Through My Mind
| align="center"| 44
|-
| Live
| align="center"| —
|-
| rowspan="3"| 1973
| The Billy Walker Show (with Mike Curb Congregation)
| align="center"| —
|-
| All Time Greatest Hits
| align="center"| —
|-
| The Hand of Love
| align="center"| —
|-
| 1974
| Too Many Memories
| align="center"| —
|-
| 1975
| Lovin' and Losin'''
| align="center"| 27
| rowspan="3"| RCA
|-
| 1976
| Alone Again| align="center"| 47
|-
| 1980
| Bye Bye Love (with Barbara Fairchild)
| align="center"| —
|-
| 1984
| Life Is a Song| align="center"| —
| EMH
|}

Singles
{| class="wikitable"
! rowspan="2"| Year
! rowspan="2"| Single
! colspan="3"| Chart Positions
! rowspan="2"| Album
|-
! width="45"| US Country
! width="45"| US
! width="45"| CAN Country
|-
| 1954
| "Thank You for Calling"
| align="center"| 8
| align="center"| —
| align="center"| —
| rowspan="4"| singles only
|-
| 1957
| "On My Mind Again"
| align="center"| 12
| align="center"| —
| align="center"| —
|-
| rowspan="2"| 1960
| "Forever"
| align="center"| —
| align="center"| 83
| align="center"| —
|-
| "I Wish You Love"
| align="center"| 19
| align="center"| —
| align="center"| —
|-
| 1961
| "Funny How Time Slips Away"
| align="center"| 23
| align="center"| —
| align="center"| —
| rowspan="3"| Greatest Hits|-
| rowspan="2"| 1962
| "Charlie's Shoes"
| align="center"| 1
| align="center"| —
| align="center"| —
|-
| "Willie the Weeper"
| align="center"| 5
| align="center"| —
| align="center"| —
|-
| rowspan="2"| 1963
| "Heart, Be Careful"
| align="center"| 21
| align="center"| —
| align="center"| —
| rowspan="4"| Thank You for Calling|-
| "The Morning Paper"
| align="center"| 22
| align="center"| —
| align="center"| —
|-
| rowspan="3"| 1964
| "Circumstances"
| align="center"| 7
| align="center"| —
| align="center"| —
|-
| "It's Lonesome"
| align="center"| 43
| align="center"| —
| align="center"| —
|-
| "Cross the Brazos at Waco"
| align="center"| 2
| align="center"| 128
| align="center"| 5
| rowspan="2"| The Gun, the Gold and the Girl /Cross the Brazos at Waco|-
| rowspan="3"| 1965
| "Matamoros"
| align="center"| 8
| align="center"| —
| align="center"| —
|-
| "If It Pleases You"
| align="center"| 16
| align="center"| —
| align="center"| —
| rowspan="2"| singles only
|-
| "I'm So Miserable Without You"
| align="center"| 45
| align="center"| —
| align="center"| —
|-
| rowspan="3"| 1966
| "The Old French Quarter (In New Orleans)"
| align="center"| 49
| align="center"| —
| align="center"| —
| rowspan="2"| A Million and One|-
| "A Million and One"
| align="center"| 2
| align="center"| —
| align="center"| —
|-
| "Bear with Me a Little Longer"
| align="center"| 3
| align="center"| —
| align="center"| —
| rowspan="2"| The Walker Way|-
| rowspan="3"| 1967
| "Anything Your Heart Desires"
| align="center"| 10
| align="center"| —
| align="center"| —
|-
| "In Del Rio"
| align="center"| 18
| align="center"| —
| align="center"| —
| rowspan="2"| I Taught Her Everything She Knows|-
| "I Taught Her Everything She Knows"
| align="center"| 11
| align="center"| —
| align="center"| 19
|-
| rowspan="3"| 1968
| "Sundown Mary"
| align="center"| 18
| align="center"| —
| align="center"| —
| rowspan="4"| Portrait of Billy|-
| "Ramona"
| align="center"| 8
| align="center"| —
| align="center"| 14
|-
| "Age of Worry"
| align="center"| 20
| align="center"| —
| align="center"| 24
|-
| rowspan="4"| 1969
| "From the Bottle to the Bottom" (with The Tennessee Walkers)
| align="center"| 20
| align="center"| —
| align="center"| —
|-
| "Smoky Places"
| align="center"| 12
| align="center"| —
| align="center"| —
| rowspan="4"| Darling Days|-
| "Better Homes and Gardens"
| align="center"| 37
| align="center"| —
| align="center"| —
|-
| "Thinking 'Bout You, Babe"
| align="center"| 9
| align="center"| —
| align="center"| 32
|-
| rowspan="3"| 1970
| "Darling Days"
| align="center"| 23
| align="center"| —
| align="center"| —
|-
| "When a Man Loves a Woman (The Way That I Love You)"
| align="center"| 3
| align="center"| —
| align="center"| —
| When a Man Loves a Woman (The Way That I Love You)|-
| "She Goes Walking Through My Mind"
| align="center"| 3
| align="center"| —
| align="center"| 8
| rowspan="2"| I'm Gonna Keep On Lovin' You /She Goes Walking Through My Mind|-
| rowspan="4"| 1971
| "I'm Gonna Keep On Keep On Lovin' You"
| align="center"| 3
| align="center"| —
| align="center"| 26
|-
| "It's Time to Love Her"
| align="center"| 28
| align="center"| —
| align="center"| —
| rowspan="3"| singles only
|-
| "Don't Let Him Make a Memory Out of Me"
| align="center"| 22
| align="center"| —
| align="center"| —
|-
| "Traces of a Woman"
| align="center"| 25
| align="center"| —
| align="center"| 34
|-
| 1972
| "Sing Me a Love Song to Baby"
| align="center"| 3
| align="center"| —
| align="center"| 63
| rowspan="2"| All Time Greatest Hits|-
| rowspan="4"| 1973
| "My Mind Hangs on to You"
| align="center"| 34
| align="center"| —
| align="center"| —
|-
| "The Hand of Love"
| align="center"| 52
| align="center"| —
| align="center"| —
| rowspan="2"| The Hand of Love|-
| "Margarita"
| align="center"| —
| align="center"| —
| align="center"| —
|-
| "Too Many Memories"
| align="center"| 96
| align="center"| —
| align="center"| —
| rowspan="2"| Too Many Memories|-
| rowspan="3"| 1974
| "I Changed My Mind"
| align="center"| 39
| align="center"| —
| align="center"| 63
|-
| "How Far Our Love Goes"
| align="center"| 74
| align="center"| —
| align="center"| —
| rowspan="2"| singles only
|-
| "Fine as Wine"
| align="center"| 73
| align="center"| —
| align="center"| —
|-
| rowspan="3"| 1975
| "Word Games"
| align="center"| 10
| align="center"| —
| align="center"| 13
| rowspan="2"| Lovin' and Losin
|-
| "If I'm Losing You"
| align="center"| 25
| align="center"| —
| align="center"| 31
|-
| "Don't Stop in My World (If You Don't Mean to Stay)"
| align="center"| 19
| align="center"| —
| align="center"| 18
| rowspan="2"| Alone Again|-
| rowspan="3"| 1976
| "(Here I Am) Alone Again"
| align="center"| 41
| align="center"| —
| align="center"| —
|-
| "Love You All to Pieces"
| align="center"| 67
| align="center"| —
| align="center"| —
| rowspan="14"| singles only
|-
| "Instead of Givin' Up (I'm Givin' In)"
| align="center"| 48
| align="center"| —
| align="center"| —
|-
| rowspan="3"| 1977
| "(If You Can) Why Can't I"
| align="center"| 100
| align="center"| —
| align="center"| —
|-
| "It Always Brings Me Back Around to You"
| align="center"| 86
| align="center"| —
| align="center"| —
|-
| "Ringgold, Georgia" (with Brenda Kaye Perry)
| align="center"| 64
| align="center"| —
| align="center"| —
|-
| rowspan="3"| 1978
| "Carlena and Jose Gomez"
| align="center"| 57
| align="center"| —
| align="center"| —
|-
| "It's Not Over Till It's Over"
| align="center"| 92
| align="center"| —
| align="center"| —
|-
| "You're a Violin That Never Has Been Played"
| align="center"| 82
| align="center"| —
| align="center"| 55
|-
| rowspan="4"| 1979
| "Lawyers"
| align="center"| 72
| align="center"| —
| align="center"| —
|-
| "Sweet Lovin' Things"
| align="center"| 69
| align="center"| —
| align="center"| —
|-
| "Rainbow and Roses"
| align="center"| flip
| align="center"| —
| align="center"| —
|-
| "A Little Bit Short on Love (A Little Bit Long on Tears)"
| align="center"| 70
| align="center"| —
| align="center"| —
|-
| rowspan="2"| 1980
| "You Turn My Love Light On"
| align="center"| 48
| align="center"| —
| align="center"| —
|-
| "Answer Game"
| align="center"| —
| align="center"| —
| align="center"| —
|-
| rowspan="2"| 1983
| "One Away from One Too Many"
| align="center"| 93
| align="center"| —
| align="center"| —
| rowspan="2"| Life Is a Song|-
| "Pardon My Asking"
| align="center"| —
| align="center"| —
| align="center"| —
|-
| 1985
| "Coffee Brown Eyes"
| align="center"| 81
| align="center"| —
| align="center"| —
| rowspan="2"| singles only
|-
| 1988
| "Wild Texas Rose"
| align="center"| 79
| align="center"| —
| align="center"| —
|}

Singles from collaboration albums

Notes

References
[ AllMusic entry on Billy Walker]
Escott, Colin. (1998). "Billy Walker". In The Encyclopedia of Country Music''. Paul Kingsbury, Editor. New York: Oxford University Press. pp. 566–7.

External links

Billy Walker & Patsy Cline Plane Crash
Charles Lilly tribute Web site

1929 births
2006 deaths
American male singer-songwriters
American country guitarists
American male guitarists
American country singer-songwriters
People from Crosby County, Texas
Road incident deaths in Alabama
Musicians from Dallas
Grand Ole Opry members
Capitol Records artists
Columbia Records artists
MGM Records artists
Monument Records artists
RCA Records artists
20th-century American singers
20th-century American guitarists
Singer-songwriters from Texas
Guitarists from Texas
Country musicians from Texas
20th-century American male singers